This is the discography for Jamaican reggae production duo Sly and Robbie.

Discography

References

External Links
 

Reggae discographies
Discographies of Jamaican artists